Last Night on Earth is the third studio album by the English indie folk band Noah and the Whale. It was released on 7 March 2011 on Mercury Records. It peaked to number 8 on the UK Albums Chart. The first single from the album was "L.I.F.E.G.O.E.S.O.N.", and the song "Wild Thing" is available to download for free from their website.

Background
Following The First Days of Spring (2009), the band's original drummer, Doug Fink, left to complete his medical training. The group's new addition, Michael Petulla, was found via online classified Gumtree. Bassist Matt Owens and guitarist Fred Abbott auditioned upwards of 100 drummers and eventually narrowed it down to 10, from which point the band rehearsed with each to see which was the best fit. Petulla, the last auditionee of the day, was picked. The band first began recording Last Night on Earth in 2010 at Bethnal Green Great Synagogue in London, but the band eventually needed a change in scenery and moved to Los Angeles to work with producer Jason Lader. The band started at the synagogue due its spacious sound, but ended up working with Lader based on his work with Jay-Z and Julian Casablancas.

Vocalist/guitarist Charlie Fink wrote of adolescence and, in his words, "that excitement of being young and being in the night." The ambition was unapologetically fuelled by the music of Bruce Springsteen. In addition, Last Night on Earth is influenced by several different sources, including Tom Waits's 1992 album Bone Machine, the poetry of Frank O'Hara, the art of Edward Hopper, and the work of John Cale, Arthur Russell and Lou Reed. Reed's Berlin (1973) was particularly influential on Fink's desire to step outside his comfort zone, lyrically. "Once you've opened up the third-person narrative it means you have to rely less on your own life and it's more fantasy and fiction," said Fink, whose songwriting expanded to a "strikingly visual style," inspired by cinema. The process, Fink felt, exerted a tangible influence on the way he approached lyrics on Last Night on Earth. The album, in contrast to the band's prior two efforts, is a move away from autobiography, and tells short stories in song. For example, "Wild Thing" began as a 10-minute, richly detailed epic in the style of Street Hassle, before Fink boiled it down to its five-minute essence. The track, another instance of Fink's cinema-inspired songwriting, was designed to have a "Twin Peaks feel."

Following the commercial success of Last Night on Earth, the band toured extensively, including three separate treks to the United States. "There was a week where we did Japan, Australia, Canada and Chicago in eight days. And I hate flying," remarked Fink.

Singles
 "L.I.F.E.G.O.E.S.O.N." was released on 23 January 2011 as the first single from their album. Having debuted at number 37, the single spent a total of 8 weeks in the top 40 before reaching a peak of number 14; marking the band's second most successful single behind "5 Years Time" - which peaked at number 9. The single also saw success in Ireland, where it reached a peak of number 30.
 "Tonight's the Kind of Night" was released on 16 May 2011 as the second single from their album.
 Opening track "Life Is Life" was released 8 August 2011. A video for the song had already been released earlier.
 "Waiting For My Chance To Come" was released on 12 September 2011, with an inspired video shot aboard a lightship in the Pool of London.

Track listing
All songs by Charlie Fink

Personnel

Noah and the Whale
Charlie Fink - vocals, guitar, art direction, design, production
 Tom Hobden - violin, keys
 Matt Owens - bass guitar
 Fred Abbott - guitar, keys
 Michael Petulla - drums

Artwork
Tom Bird – art direction, photography
Autumn de Wilde - photography
Markus Karlsson - art direction, design, cover art
Mat Maitland - art direction, design

Production
Jason Lader – production, mixing engineer
Russell Fawcus – assistant engineer
Tom Elmhirst - mixing
Mike Marsh – mastering engineer
Chris Gentry – management

Chart performance 
In 2011, Last Night on Earth sold 261,000 copies in the UK.

Release history

References

2011 albums
Noah and the Whale albums
Mercury Records albums
Albums recorded at Sound City Studios